"Home" is a song written by Bobby Harden that was originally performed by American country music artist Loretta Lynn. It was released as a single in July 1975 via MCA Records.

Background and reception 
"Home" was recorded at the Bradley's Barn on March 5, 1974. Located in Mount Juliet, Tennessee, the session was produced by renowned country music producer Owen Bradley. Three additional tracks were recorded during this session.

"Home" reached number ten on the Billboard Hot Country Singles survey in 1975. Additionally, the song peaked at number five on the Canadian RPM Country Songs chart during this same period. It was included on her studio album, Home (1975).

Track listings 
7" vinyl single
 "Home" – 2:10
 "You Take Me to Heaven Every Night" – 2:44

Charts

Weekly charts

References 

1975 songs
1975 singles
MCA Records singles
Loretta Lynn songs
Song recordings produced by Owen Bradley
Songs written by Bobby Harden